Paper computer may refer to:

 Papanek paper computer (Bisociation tool), a paper computer by Victor Papanek for design work
 WDR paper computer, an educational register machine computer constructed of paper
 PaperWindows, a bendable electronic paper computer by the Human Media Lab
 Electronic paper
 Flexible display
 Digital paper
 Ace of Aces (picture book game)

See also
 The Computer Paper, a Canadian computer magazine
 Computer paper, continuous form paper for use with dot-matrix and line printers
 Calculator paper, paper rolls used by printing electronic calculators
 Paper calculator